Appasaheb Dharmadhikari, also known as Dattatreya Narayan Dharmadhikari, (born 14 May 1946) is an Indian social worker from Maharashtra. Following footsteps of Dr. Nanasaheb Dharmadhikari, Appasaheb has been instrumental in conducting various tree plantations, blood donation camps, free medical camps, job fairs, cleanliness drives, superstition eradication, de-addiction centers, etc. in Maharashtra. In 2014, he was conferred with Doctor of Letters by Dr D Y Patil University, Nerul. In 2017, he was awarded Padma Shri, India's fourth highest civilian honour, and Maharashtra Bhushan award in 2023.

References 

Social workers from Maharashtra
Recipients of the Padma Shri in social work
Social workers
Living people
1946 births